Foggy Bottom Observatory  is an astronomical observatory owned and operated by Colgate University. Its IAU code is 776. Built in 1951, it is located in Hamilton, New York (USA).

See also 
List of astronomical observatories

References

External links
 Foggy Bottom Observatory Clear Sky Clock Forecasts of observing conditions.

Astronomical observatories in New York (state)